Modern Warfare 2: Ghost is a six-part comic book mini-series. The series ties-in with the 2009 video game Call of Duty: Modern Warfare 2, focusing on the character Simon "Ghost" Riley. The first issue of the series debuted on November 11, 2009, and the second issue followed in December.

Publication history
Modern Warfare 2: Ghost was announced by Community Manager Robert Bowling via Twitter on August 17, 2009. The comic was published by Storm Productions and written by David Lapham, with art by Kevin West and Federico Dallocchio, who drew the covers of each issue.

Plot
Modern Warfare 2: Ghost relates to the history of SAS (Special air service) Simon "Ghost" Riley, an important character in Call of Duty: Modern Warfare 2. The comic series is set before Ghost became a member of Task Force 141, with events from both before and leading into the game, focusing on the origins of the character, his skull-like mask, and why he calls himself Ghost.

Episode 1: Dead for a Day
The first installment begins to tell the story of how Ghost came to use his skull-branded balaclava. The narrative begins in a school in Lysychansk, Ukraine, and shows Ghost being held captive by a group of masked men. He then begins to tell about an old friend of his, Lieutenant Simon Riley. Riley is recruited from his unit, the legendary 22nd Regiment of the Special Air Service, to join a task force made up of DEVGRU and Delta Force operators. The task force is assigned to eliminate Roba, a Mexican drug lord working with anti-Western terrorists. However, things start to unravel during the mission when a team member is killed after his parachute fails to open during a jump. Riley suspects that there's a traitor among them. His hunch turns out to be correct when one of his comrades turns his gun on the team and reveals that Roba is aware of their presence. Riley manages to fight his way out of trouble only to be shot by Roba himself, leaving the action at a cliffhanger.

Episode 2: Dead Life
Lt. Riley and the surviving members of his team are captured by Roba's cartel. During their captivity, they endure continuous torture and advanced brainwashing techniques as Roba intends to use them for his own interests. Throughout this ordeal, the reader sees flashbacks of Riley's early life, from his childhood and how he had to endure an abusive fiend of a father, to his early years in the SAS and how he — after coming back from his first tour of duty in Afghanistan in January 2003 — takes care of his abused mother and helps clean up his drug-addicted younger brother, Tommy. In March 2004, he finally puts an end to his father's abuse and kicks him out of the house. By June 2006, Riley is seen as the best man at Tommy's wedding. 
During these flashbacks, many of Riley's adversaries are seen wearing "ghostly" makeup (presumably a hallucination of Riley's) of similar style to that worn by participants celebrating the Day of the Dead. Eventually, two USSOCOM operators, Sparks and Washington, manage to escape after learning that the cartel plans to kill them for resisting the brainwashing. Riley is left behind, and Roba punishes him for the escape by having him dragged outside, thrown into a coffin that has been dug up, and then buried alive with the decaying corpse of a deceased soldier, Major Vernon.

Episode 3: Dead Will Follow
Back at the school, Ghost continues to tell Lt. Riley's story until he interrupts himself when he eyes one of the terrorists taking a good look at one of the young female victims also being held hostage and how upset and uncomfortable she's becoming. He shouts at him and catches him off-guard, making a comment that he basically knows what he's thinking of doing to her ("Prom's not for month's yet!" etc.), before continuing his story.

After being buried alive in the previous issue, Lt. Riley is now in a coffin with Major Vernon's corpse and wondering what he's going to do. It is only by using the major's lower jaw bone as a trowel that Riley is able to dig himself up from the grave, which takes him thirteen hours. After a quick rest, he makes for the border, and within days, is struck down by dehydration and delirium. He has vague memories of people helping him, but by the time he makes it across the border, about a month later, he has badly infected cuts, sores and wounds, is badly dehydrated, and has become delirious. He collapses in the sand and just lays there to die.  He is later found by a Texas sheriff who takes him to a hospital. The story then jumps to December 18, 2010 (four months and a few weeks later); Riley is being debriefed about his experience to his superiors. Physically, Riley is fine, but his superiors fear that his mental state is still in question. Riley starts being plagued by nightmares of Roba taunting him. After one of his nightmares, he and his mother have a small talk, and he learns a few things about his father that are both disturbing but meaningful to the plot as well.

While spending Christmas with his family, Riley gets a surprise visit from Sparks. The two men have a beer together at a local pub, where they rehash old times and their experience during their time in Mexico. Sparks tells Riley that he and Washington will soon deploy to Afghanistan. He then notices  woman with a nice body that he likes – and wants - as the conversation goes on. While walking back home, Sparks approaches the young woman and tries to sweet talk her into bed, but the young woman is not impressed. Sparks angrily knocks the woman unconscious and orders Riley to help him get her inside her house so that they can rape her. Riley secretly calls the police and they arrive just before any harm can be done to the woman, forcing Riley and Sparks to flee. Once they both arrive at Sparks' hotel room, Sparks starts having a panic attack and collapses on the bed and asks Riley to get his pills for him. Riley suspects that Sparks is up to something and when he finally pieces together the clues, Sparks points a gun at Riley's head. Riley immediately disarms Sparks and interrogates him. At first, Spark just says he "Wants to go back", but then finally reveals that he and Washington were allowed to "escape"; in truth, they've been brainwashed by Roba for months. Before Riley can get any more information, Washington arrives from an undisclosed task, exclaiming "Sparks! You won't believe what I---" and gets cut off when he sees Riley, panics, and attempts to gun him down. Riley escapes by jumping through a window, slightly injuring his leg, and steals a cab to drive away. Remembering what Roba said about his family, and what would happen if he screwed up: ("You were told what would happen..."  "This is your Mother's Skull..." "This is your Brother's Skull...") Riley speeds home and witnesses a shocking display. His mother, Tommy, sister-in-law Beth, and his nephew Joseph, have all been brutally murdered by Washington. Riley vows that he will kill them all: Sparks, Washington, Roba, and his entire clan.

Episode 4: Dead Won't Leave
Haunted by the murder of his loved ones, Riley swears to hunt down the man responsible.

Episode 5: Dead Won't Rise
As Ghost begins to finish his story, the leader of the terrorists suddenly barges in fully armed and says the soldiers outside are taking positions and to get ready for a fight. Ghost looks at him and continues his story as though nothing is wrong. Riley is shown sneaking into a military base, where he kills Washington in his sleep and kidnaps Sparks, taking him back to his house and showing him his family's remains. Sparks begs for mercy, but Riley isn't listening. He binds, gags, and beats Sparks, then murders him and burns the house down to destroy the body. He makes sure to leave his dog tags behind so it seems he was the one who died. The base goes on alert the next morning when Washington's body is found, and the base commander checks the previous night's surveillance tapes. In Mexico, two retired military men are enjoying themselves on vacation when they are both ambushed and killed. Riley learns about the ambush and decides to hunt down the killers. He finds one of them, and takes him to a remote location to be tortured for information. He learns that Roba is trying to cover up any evidence of his crimes, giving him the perfect opportunity for revenge.

Episode 6: Dead and Gone
Riley locates the manor where Roba is hiding after a long trek through the jungle. Roba is captured after a firefight and tells Riley that, when his parents died in a crossfire, the terrorist within him saw that "a few people are nothing among a billion". Riley then finishes him off, escaping Roba's burning mansion while killing the rest of his guards. Back at the elementary school, the terrorists holding Ghost and the students hostage decide to act, but Ghost, having freed himself while using the story as a distraction, pins them down while backup arrives. A girl then asks if Ghost and Riley are the same man and if the story he told is true. Ghost then answers that his story is "true enough to that lot". The series ends with a flashback to Riley walking away from Roba's burning mansion. He is suddenly approached by a high-ranking military officer with a "Task Force 141" badge, leaving the impression that this is the moment when Ghost is born.

References

Call of Duty
Comics based on video games
Works based on Activision video games
2009 comics debuts